Gianluca Naso and Walter Trusendi were the defending champions, but only Trusendi chose to compete this year.
He partnered with Thomas Fabbiano. They reached to the quarterfinals, where he lost to Kevin Anderson and Harsh Mankad.
Martin Fischer and Philipp Oswald defeated Pablo Santos and Gabriel Trujillo-Soler 7–5, 6–3 in the final.

Seeds

Draw

Draw

References
 Doubles Draw

Internazionali di Tennis dell'Umbria - Doubles
Internazionali di Tennis Città dell'Aquila